Barsamin (Բարսամին, Barshamin Բարշամին) was a weather or sky god among the pre-Christian Armenians. He is probably derived from the Semitic god Baal Shamin.

References 

Armenian gods
Sky and weather gods